Events from the year 1653 in Sweden

Incumbents
 Monarch – Christina

Events

 Magnus Gabriel De la Gardie is removed from his office and exiled from court. 
 March-April - A small peasant rebellion takes place in Närke, called Morgonstjärneupproret (Rebellion of the Morning Star), against famine and conscription: the uprising is quickly defeated.

Births

Deaths

References

 
Years of the 17th century in Sweden
Sweden